The Germanic umlaut (sometimes called i-umlaut or i-mutation) is a type of linguistic umlaut in which a back vowel changes to the associated front vowel (fronting) or a front vowel becomes closer to  (raising) when the following syllable contains , , or . 

It took place separately in various Germanic languages starting around AD 450 or 500 and affected all of the early languages except Gothic. An example of the resulting vowel alternation is the English plural foot ~ feet (from Proto-Germanic , pl. ). Germanic umlaut, as covered in this article, does not include other historical vowel phenomena that operated in the history of the Germanic languages such as Germanic a-mutation and the various language-specific processes of u-mutation, nor the earlier Indo-European ablaut (vowel gradation), which is observable in the conjugation of Germanic strong verbs such as sing/sang/sung.

Umlaut is a form of assimilation or vowel harmony, the process by which one speech sound is altered to make it more like another adjacent sound. If a word has two vowels with one far back in the mouth and the other far forward, more effort is required to pronounce the word than if the vowels were closer together; therefore, one possible linguistic development is for these two vowels to be drawn closer together.

Description 

Germanic umlaut is a specific historical example of this process that took place in the unattested earliest stages of Old English and Old Norse and apparently later in Old High German, and some other old Germanic languages. The precise developments varied from one language to another, but the general trend was this:
Thus, for example, West Germanic  "mice" shifted to proto-Old English , which eventually developed to modern mice, while the singular form  lacked a following  and was unaffected, eventually becoming modern mouse.
 When a low or mid-front vowel occurred in a syllable and the front vowel  or the front glide  occurred in the next, the vowel in the first syllable was raised. This happened less often in the Germanic languages, partly because of earlier vowel harmony in similar contexts. However, for example, proto-Old English  became  in, for example,  >  'bed'.
The fronted variant caused by umlaut was originally allophonic (a variant sound automatically predictable from the context), but it later became phonemic (a separate sound in its own right) when the context was lost but the variant sound remained. The following examples show how, when final  was lost, the variant sound  became a new phoneme in Old English:

Outcomes in modern spelling and pronunciation 

The following table surveys how Proto-Germanic vowels which later underwent i-umlaut generally appear in modern languages — though there are many exceptions to these patterns owing to other sound-changes and chance variations. The table gives two West Germanic examples (English and German) and two North Germanic examples (Swedish, from the east, and Icelandic, from the west). Spellings are marked by pointy brackets (⟨...⟩) and pronunciation, given in the international phonetic alphabet, in slashes (/.../).

German orthography 

German orthography is generally consistent in its representation of i-umlaut. The umlaut diacritic, consisting of two dots above the vowel, is used for the fronted vowels, making the historical process much more visible in the modern language than is the case in English:  – ,  – ,  – ,  – . This is a neat solution when pairs of words with and without umlaut mutation are compared, as in umlauted plurals like  –  ("mother" – "mothers").

However, in a small number of words, a vowel affected by i-umlaut is not marked with the umlaut diacritic because its origin is not obvious. Either there is no unumlauted equivalent or they are not recognized as a pair because the meanings have drifted apart. Likewise,  ("old") has the comparative  ("older"), but the noun from this is spelled  ("parents"). ("effort") has the verb  ("to spend, to dedicate") and the adjective  ("requiring effort") though the 1996 spelling reform now permits the alternative spelling  (but not ). For , see below.

Some words have umlaut diacritics that do not mark a vowel produced by the sound change of umlaut. Here the diacritic is a purely phonological marker, indicating that the English and French sounds (or at least, the approximation of them used in German) are identical to the native German umlauted sounds. Similarly, Big Mac was originally spelt  in German.

Substitution 

Orthography and design history

The German phonological umlaut is present in the Old High German period and continues to develop in Middle High German. This can still be seen in some names: Goethe, Goebbels, Staedtler.

Unusual umlaut designs are sometimes also created for graphic design purposes, such as to fit an umlaut into tightly-spaced lines of text. It may include umlauts placed vertically or inside the body of the letter.

Morphological effects 

Although umlaut was not a grammatical process, umlauted vowels often serve to distinguish grammatical forms (and thus show similarities to ablaut when viewed synchronically), as can be seen in the English word man. In ancient Germanic, it and some other words had the plural suffix , with the same vowel as the singular. In English, such plurals are rare: man, woman, tooth, goose, foot, mouse, louse, brother (archaic or specialized plural in brethren), and cow (poetic and dialectal plural in kine). It also can be found in a few fossilized diminutive forms, such as kitten from cat and kernel from corn, and the feminine vixen from fox. Umlaut is conspicuous when it occurs in one of such a pair of forms, but there are many mutated words without an unmutated parallel form. Germanic actively derived causative weak verbs from ordinary strong verbs by applying a suffix, which later caused umlaut, to a past tense form. Some of these survived into modern English as doublets of verbs, including fell and set vs. fall and sit.

Parallel umlauts in some modern Germanic languages

Umlaut in Germanic verbs 

Some interesting examples of umlaut involve vowel distinctions in Germanic verbs. Although these are often subsumed under the heading "ablaut" in tables of Germanic irregular verbs, they are a separate phenomenon.

Present stem Umlaut in strong verbs 

A variety of umlaut occurs in the second and third person singular forms of the present tense of some Germanic strong verbs. For example, German  ("to catch") has the present tense . The verb  ("give") has the present tense , but the shift → would not be a normal result of umlaut in German. There are, in fact, two distinct phenomena at play here; the first is indeed umlaut as it is best known, but the second is older and occurred already in Proto-Germanic itself. In both cases, a following  triggered a vowel change, but in Proto-Germanic, it affected only .

Present stem Umlaut in weak verbs 

The German word  ("reverse umlaut"), sometimes known in English as "unmutation", is a term given to the vowel distinction between present and preterite forms of certain Germanic weak verbs. These verbs exhibit the dental suffix used to form the preterite of weak verbs, and also exhibit what appears to be the vowel gradation characteristic of strong verbs. Examples in English are think/thought, bring/brought, tell/told, sell/sold. The phenomenon can also be observed in some German verbs including  ("burn/burnt"),  ("know/knew"), and a handful of others. In some dialects, particularly of western Germany, the phenomenon is preserved in many more forms (for example Luxembourgish , "to put", and Limburgish , "to tell, count"). The cause lies with the insertion of the semivowel  between the verb stem and inflectional ending. This  triggers umlaut, as explained above. In long stem verbs however, the  fell out of the preterite. Thus, while short stem verbs exhibit umlaut in all tenses, long stem verbs only do so in the present. When the German philologist Jacob Grimm first attempted to explain the phenomenon, he assumed that the lack of umlaut in the preterite resulted from the reversal of umlaut. In actuality, umlaut never occurred in the first place. Nevertheless, the term "Rückumlaut" makes some sense since the verb exhibits a shift from an umlauted vowel in the basic form (the infinitive) to a plain vowel in the respective inflections.

Umlaut as a subjunctive marker 

In German, some verbs which display a back vowel in the past tense undergo umlaut in the subjunctive mood:  (ind.) →  (subj.) ("sing/sang");  (ind.) →  (subj.) ("fence/fenced"). Again, this is due to the presence of a following  in the verb endings in the Old High German period.

Historical survey by language

West Germanic languages

Although umlaut operated the same way in all the West Germanic languages, the exact words in which it took place and the outcomes of the process differ between the languages. Of particular note is the loss of word-final  after heavy syllables. In the more southern languages (Old High German, Old Dutch, Old Saxon), forms that lost  often show no umlaut, but in the more northern languages (Old English, Old Frisian), the forms do. Compare Old English  "guest", which shows umlaut, and Old High German , which does not, both from Proto-Germanic . That may mean that there was dialectal variation in the timing and spread of the two changes, with final loss happening before umlaut in the south but after it in the north. On the other hand, umlaut may have still been partly allophonic, and the loss of the conditioning sound may have triggered an "un-umlauting" of the preceding vowel. Nevertheless, medial  consistently triggers umlaut although its subsequent loss is universal in West Germanic except for Old Saxon and early Old High German.

I-mutation in Old English

I-mutation generally affected Old English vowels as follows in each of the main dialects. It led to the introduction into Old English of the new sounds ,  (which, in most varieties, soon turned into ), and a sound written in Early West Saxon manuscripts as  but whose phonetic value is debated.

I-mutation is particularly visible in the inflectional and derivational morphology of Old English since it affected so many of the Old English vowels. Of 16 basic vowels and diphthongs in Old English, only the four vowels  were unaffected by i-mutation. These are most common forms affected:
The plural, and genitive/dative singular, forms of consonant-declension nouns (Proto-Germanic (PGmc) ), as compared to the nominative/accusative singular – e.g.,  "foot",  "feet";  "mouse",  "mice".  Many more words were affected by this change in Old English vs. modern English – e.g.,  "book",  "books";  "friend",  "friends".
The second and third person present singular indicative of strong verbs (Pre-Old-English (Pre-OE)), as compared to the infinitive and other present-tense forms – e.g.  "to help",  "(I) help",  "(you sg.) help",  "(he/she) helps",  "(we/you pl./they) help".
The comparative form of some adjectives (Pre-OE  < PGmc , Pre-OE  < PGmc ), as compared to the base form – e.g.  "old",  "older",  "oldest" (cf. "elder, eldest").
Throughout the first class of weak verbs (original suffix ), as compared to the forms from which the verbs were derived – e.g.  "food",  "to feed" < Pre-OE ;  "lore",  "to teach";  "to fall",  "to fell".
In female forms of several nouns with the suffix  (PGmc ) – e.g.,  "god",  "goddess" (cf. German);  "fox",  "vixen".
In i-stem abstract nouns derived from verbs (PGmc ) – e.g.  "a coming",  "to come";  "a son (orig., a being born)",  "to bear";  "a falling",  "to fall";  "a bond",  "to bind".  Note that in some cases the abstract noun has a different vowel than the corresponding verb, due to Proto-Indo-European ablaut.

Notes
However, in many cases  appears. Most  in Old English stem from earlier  because of a change called a-restoration.
In Old English,  generally stems from a-mutation of original . For example,  comes from late Proto-Germanic , from earlier .

A few hundred years after i-umlaut began, another similar change called double umlaut occurred.

  "witch" < PGmc  (cf. Old High German )
  "embers" < Pre-OE  < PGmc  (cf. Old High German )
  "errand" < PGmc  (cf. Old Saxon )
  "to hasten" < archaic  < Pre-OE 
  "upmost" < PGmc  (cf. Gothic )

I-mutation in High German 
By then, it had already become partly phonologized, since some of the conditioning  and  sounds had been deleted or modified.

That has led to a controversy over when and how i-mutation appeared on these vowels. Some (for example, Herbert Penzl) have suggested that the vowels must have been modified without being indicated for lack of proper symbols and/or because the difference was still partly allophonic. It must also be kept in mind that it is an issue of relative chronology: already early in the history of attested OHG, some umlauting factors are known to have disappeared (such as word-internal  after geminates and clusters), and depending on the age of OHG umlaut, that could explain some cases where expected umlaut is missing. The whole question should now be reconsidered in the light of Fausto Cercignani's suggestion that the Old High German umlaut phenomena produced phonemic changes before the factors that triggered them off changed or disappeared, because the umlaut allophones gradually shifted to such a degree that they became distinctive in the phonological system of the language and contrastive at a lexical level.

However, sporadic place-name attestations demonstrate the presence of the secondary umlaut already for the early 9th century, which makes it likely that all types of umlaut were indeed already present in Old High German, even if they were not indicated in the spelling. Presumably, they arose already in the early 8th century. Fausto Cercignani prefers the assimilation theory and presents a history of the OHG umlauted vowels up to the present day.

In modern German, umlaut as a marker of the plural of nouns is a regular feature of the language, and although umlaut itself is no longer a productive force in German, new plurals of this type can be created by analogy. Likewise, umlaut marks the comparative of many adjectives and other kinds of derived forms. Because of the grammatical importance of such pairs, the German umlaut diacritic was developed, making the phenomenon very visible.

In various dialects, the umlaut became even more important as a morphological marker of the plural after the apocope of final schwa; that rounded front vowels have become unrounded in many dialects does not prevent them from serving as markers of the plural given that they remain distinct from their non-umlauted counterparts (just like in English foot – feet, mouse – mice). The example  "guest" vs.  "guests" served as the model for analogical pairs like  "day" vs.  "days" (vs. standard ) and  "arm" vs.  "arms" (vs. standard ). Even plural forms like  "fish" which had never had a front rounded vowel in the first place were interpreted as such (i.e., as if from Middle High German **) and led to singular forms like   that are attested in some dialects.

I-mutation in Old Saxon 
In Old Saxon, umlaut is much less apparent than in Old Norse. It must have had a greater effect than the orthography shows since all later dialects have a regular umlaut of both long and short vowels.

I-mutation in Dutch 
The lengthening in open syllables in early Middle Dutch then lengthened and lowered this short  to long  (spelled ) in some words.

In general, the effects of the Germanic umlaut in plural formation are limited. One of the defining phonological features of Dutch, is the general absence of the I-mutation or secondary umlaut when dealing with long vowels. Unlike English and German, Dutch does not palatalize the long vowels, which are notably absent from the language. As a result of this relatively sparse occurrence of umlaut, standard Dutch does not use umlaut as a grammatical marker. An exception is the noun  "city" which has the irregular umlauted plural .

Later developments in Middle Dutch show that long vowels and diphthongs were not affected by umlaut in the more western dialects, including those in western Brabant and Holland that were most influential for standard Dutch. However in what is traditionally called the Cologne Expansion (the spread of certain West German features in the south-easternmost Dutch dialects during the High Medieval period) the more eastern and southeastern dialects of Dutch, including easternmost Brabantian and all of Limburgish have umlaut of long vowels (or in case of Limburgish, all rounded back vowels), however. Consequently, these dialects also make grammatical use of umlaut to form plurals and diminutives, much as most other modern Germanic languages do.

North Germanic languages

The situation in Old Norse is complicated as there are two forms of i-mutation. Of these two, only one is phonologized. I-mutation in Old Norse is phonological:
 In Proto-Norse, if the syllable was heavy and followed by vocalic  ( > , but  > ) or, regardless of syllable weight, if followed by consonantal  ( > ). The rule is not perfect, as some light syllables were still umlauted:  > ,  > .
 In Old Norse, if the following syllable contains a remaining Proto-Norse . For example, the root of the dative singular of u-stems are i-mutated as the desinence contains a Proto-Norse , but the dative singular of a-stems is not, as their desinence stems from Proto-Norse .

I-mutation is not phonological if the vowel of a long syllable is i-mutated by a syncopated i. I-mutation does not occur in short syllables.

See also 

 Germanic a-mutation
 I-mutation
 Indo-European ablaut
 Umlaut (disambiguation)
 Umlaut (diacritic)

References

Bibliography 
 Malmkjær, Kirsten (Ed.) (2002). The linguistics encyclopedia (2nd ed.). London: Routledge, Taylor & Francis Group. .
 Campbell, Lyle (2004). Historical Linguistics: An Introduction (2nd ed.). Edinburgh University Press.
 Cercignani, Fausto, Early "Umlaut" Phenomena in the Germanic Languages, in «Language», 56/1, 1980, pp. 126–136.
 Cercignani, Fausto, Alleged Gothic Umlauts, in «Indogermanische Forschungen», 85, 1980, pp. 207–213.
 Cercignani, Fausto, The development of the Old High German umlauted vowels and the reflex of New High German /ɛ:/ in Present Standard German, in «Linguistik online», 113/1, 2022, pp. 45–57. .
 Cercignani, Fausto, On the Germanic and Old High German distance assimilation changes, in «Linguistik online», 116/4, 2022, pp. 41–59. .

Assimilation (linguistics)
Vowel shifts
German language
Linguistic morphology
Germanic language histories
Indo-European linguistics
Germanic languages
Germanic philology
Sound laws